Pridgeon may refer to:
 Pridgeon & Clay, a metal stamping and fine-blank components provider
 Ken Pridgeon Stadium, an outdoor American football stadium located in Houston, Texas.

 people
 Francis Pridgeon (also Francis Prujean, 1593–1666), English physician
 John Pridgeon, Jr. (1852–1929), the head of a marine transport company and mayor of Detroit, Michigan
 Paul Pridgeon (born 1954), English cricket player